International Child Care Fund Holland is a small non-governmental organization that supports a project in Kibaale, a small town in the south of Uganda.  The project aims at helping AIDS victims.  In this poor area of Africa, many adults are infected with HIV.  When they die, the children are left behind.  At the project they receive the support they need.  Education is provided at the school (nursery, primary, secondary, vocational).  A clinic provides the only affordable medical help in the area.

Stichting ICCF Holland is registered in Venlo, the Netherlands. All the work is done by volunteers, which makes it possible to send 99% of the donated money to the project. Donors may sponsor a child or make a one-time donation.

Bram Moolenaar, author of the text editor Vim, is the founder and treasurer of ICCF Holland. Vim is free software, released under a charityware license that encourage users to contribute to ICCF and help children in Uganda. A message to this effect appears every time Vim is started without a file.

References

External links
 ICCF Holland home page

Children's charities based in the Netherlands
HIV/AIDS in Uganda
Kibaale District
Foreign charities operating in Uganda